The Harold Allan School is a historic school building at 15 Rebel Hill Road in Clifton, Maine.  Built in 1863, it is the town's best-preserved surviving district-level one-room schoolhouse.  It is now part of the local historical society's museum complex, which includes Cliffwood Hall, the town's former town hall.  It was listed on the National Register of Historic Places in 2008.

Description and history
The Harold Allan School is located on the southwest side of Rebel Hill Road (Maine State Route 180), a short way south of its junction with Maine State Route 9.  It stands next to Cliffwood Hall, also owned by the local historical society.  It is a modest single-story wood frame structure, with a gabled roof and clapboard siding.  A hip-roofed vestibule projects from the front, and a square hip-roofed addition extends to the side, fronted by a shed-roof vestibule.  The building's modest decorative features include corner pilasters on the main block.  The interior is mainly finished in fir flooring with beaded board wainscoting.  The addition on the left retains evidence of its original use as a two-seat outhouse.

The school was built in 1863, and is the only significantly unaltered one-room schoolhouse left in the town. By 1915 it was one of two schools left in the town, and it continued in that function until 1966, when the town's schools were consolidated into a multi-town district. The town's other school was sold into private hands and converted into a residence. This one remained vacant until 1985, when it was adapted for use as town offices and the local library. It was acquired by the local historical society in 1999.

See also
National Register of Historic Places listings in Penobscot County, Maine

References

School buildings on the National Register of Historic Places in Maine
School buildings completed in 1863
Buildings and structures in Penobscot County, Maine
Museums in Penobscot County, Maine
Schools in Penobscot County, Maine
National Register of Historic Places in Penobscot County, Maine